Vitas Gerulaitis was the defending champion, but lost in the third round this year.

Ivan Lendl successfully defended his title, defeating Anders Järryd 6–2, 6–2 in the final.

Seeds

  John McEnroe (semifinals)
  Ivan Lendl (champion)
  Jimmy Connors (semifinals)
  Yannick Noah (third round)
  Mats Wilander (second round)
  Kevin Curren (quarterfinals)
  Vitas Gerulaitis (third round)
  Johan Kriek (quarterfinals)
  Eliot Teltscher (second round)
  Sandy Mayer (third round)
  Tomáš Šmíd (second round)
  Henri Leconte (first round)
  Hank Pfister (first round)
  Wojtek Fibak (second round)
  Robert Van't Hof (second round)
  Brian Teacher (quarterfinals)

Draw

Finals

Top half

Section 1

Section 2

Section 3

Section 4

External links
 Main draw

1983 Grand Prix (tennis)